Michel Saint Lezer (born 31 August 1946) is a French ski jumper. He competed in the normal hill and large hill events at the 1968 Winter Olympics.

References

1946 births
Living people
French male ski jumpers
Olympic ski jumpers of France
Ski jumpers at the 1968 Winter Olympics
Sportspeople from Haut-Rhin